Delphi is an archaeological site in Greece.

Delphi may also refer to:

Geography

In Greece
 Delphi (modern town), a town near the eponymous archaeological site
 Delphi, a mountain in Skopelos, Greece
 Delphic oracle or Pythia, located in Delphi

In the United States
 Delphi, Indiana, small city
 Delphi, Ohio, an unincorporated community
 Delphi, Washington, an unincorporated community

Elsewhere
 Delphi, County Mayo, settlement in County Mayo, Republic of Ireland

Arts, entertainment, and media
 Delphi (Morlocks), a Marvel Comics character appearing in the Uncanny X-Men series
 Delphi (Pantheon), a Marvel Comics character appearing in the Incredible Hulk series

Brands and enterprises
 Delphi Automotive, former name of the automotive systems corporation Aptiv
 Delphi Bank, a subsidiary of Bendigo and Adelaide Bank; previously the Bank of Cyprus Australia Limited
 Delphi Technologies, an automotive systems corporation spun off from Delphi Automotive, purchased by BorgWarner in 2020

Computing 
 Delphi (software), an Object Pascal dialect and integrated development environment owned by Embarcadero Technologies
 DelPhi, macromolecular electrostatics modeling software package
 Delphi online service a former internet service provider

Crime 

 Murders of Abigail Williams and Liberty German, known as the "Delphi murders" (2017)

Education
 Delphi Schools, Inc., a non-profit educational organization aiming to establishing effective schools based on L. Ron Hubbard's ideals
 The Delphian School, the flagship Delphi School in Oregon

Science 
 DELPHI experiment (DEtector with Lepton, Photon and Hadron Identification), one of the four detectors of the Large Electron-Positron Collider at CERN
 Delphi method, a forecasting technique which relies on the input of many experts gathered anonymously

People 
Delphi Primrose (b. 2003), Scottish model

See also 
 Adelphi (disambiguation)
 Delfi (disambiguation)
 Delhi